The Guañape Islands form an island group off the coast of northern Peru. The group consists of four islands: Isla Guañape Norte, Isla Guañape Sur, Islotes Cantores, and Islotes Los Leones.

Off the southern coast of Peru, lie the Chinchaes, the Bellastras, the Lobos, the Abre, and the Guanape Islands. These islands support breeding grounds for a variety of birds that feed on marine creatures. Guano is the Spanish word for bird droppings. Over thousands of years, a 100-150 feet thick layer of guano accumulated. The primary producers of guano are white-breasted cormorants, grey pelicans, and white-headed gannets. It is estimated that around a million of these birds can live on one island and produce over 1,000 tonnes of guano annually.

Background 
Due to the unique weather conditions prevalent along the Peruvian coast, Peruvian guano is considered to be the best for farming. Due to the flow of the cold Humboldt Current along Peru's coast, the cold water prevents rainfall from occurring. The lack of rain on these islands and the tropical heat allow the accumulated guano to be baked naturally. This helps to prevent nitrates from evaporating and protects their use as fertilizer. Another reason for the guano's value is that it comes from fish-eating birds. Due to relative isolation from natural predators, guano-producing birds such as the white-breast cormorant and gray pelican have increased in number.

Fact bite 
Long before Columbus, the Incas valued guano as a fertilizer. it was so important to their culture that the Incan government divided the guano-bearing islands between the various provinces and dictated harvesting practices and schedules. Incan law provided that killing or disrupting the nesting birds that produced guano was punishable by death.

Exploitation 
In 1804 Europeans visited the islands and then returned to Europe with some guano. They understood its usefulness as a fertilizer.  Over the ensuing 45 years, Peruvians turned it into a major export product.

Economic 
Guano is a highly sought-after commodity for its value as a rich fertilizer. TPeruvian economy depends on guano export. In the 20th century, artificial fertilizers replaced guano to a large extent, affecting the Peruvian economy. Another threat is ocean warming and the El effect which has disrupted the area's unique ecosystem . It has reduced the number of fish, affecting the bird population, and causing a reduction in guano accumulation, and the economy of Peru.

Conservation 
The Guano Islands belong to Peru and provide excellent natural manure. The Peruvian government has taken steps to conserve the guano reserves

and prevent their over-exploitation. To maintain supplies, the government of Peru ensures that the islands and the birds, such as pelicans and cormorants, and the gannets are well fed and cared for.

`References

Further reading
 

 Pacific islands of Peru
 Landforms of La Libertad Region